Graecopithecus is an extinct species of hominid that lived in southeast Europe during the late Miocene around 7.2 million years ago. Originally identified by a single lower jaw bone bearing a molar tooth found in Pyrgos Vasilissis, Athens, Greece, in 1944, other tooth specimens were discovered from Azmaka quarry in Bulgaria in 2012. With only little and badly preserved materials to reveal its nature, it is considered as "the most poorly known European Miocene hominoids." The creature was popularly nicknamed 'El Graeco' (word play on the Greek-Spanish painter El Greco) by scientists.

In 2017, an international team of palaeontologists led by Madelaine Böhme of the Eberhard-Karls-University Tübingen, Germany, published a detailed analysis of the teeth and age of the specimens, and came to the conclusion that it could be the oldest hominin, meaning that it could be the oldest direct ancestors of humans after splitting from that of the chimpanzees. Their simultaneous study also claimed that contrary to the generally accepted evidences of the African origin of the hominin lineage, the ancestors of humans originated from the main ape ancestry in the Mediterranean region (before migrating into Africa where they evolved into the ancestors of Homo species). They named the origin of human theory as the "North Side Story."

These claims have been disputed by other scientists. Rick Potts and Bernard Wood argued that the evidence is too flimsy to even say it is a hominin. Tim D. White commented that the claim was only to support a biased argument that Africa is not the birthplace of humans; while Sergio Almécija stated that single characters such as teeth cannot tell the claimed evolutionary details. Systematic re-analysis by palaeontologists from the University of the Witwatersrand in 2017 did not find enough evidence to support the species as hominin or as the oldest ancestor of human lineage separating from the apes.

Discovery 
The original Graecopithecus specimen was a single mandible found in southern Greece in 1944, "reportedly unearthed as the occupying German forces were building a wartime bunker". The original finder, German paleontologist Bruno von Freyberg initially believed that it belonged to an extinct Old World monkey Mesopithecus, as he reported in 1951. However, Gustav Heinrich Ralph von Koenigswald realised that it was the tooth of an ape family and erected the scientific name Graecopithecus freybergi in 1972, after the discoverer.

Another tooth remain was discovered from Azmaka quarry in Bulgaria in 2012.

Description 

The mandible (lower jaw) of Graecopithecus with a third molar that is very worn, the root of a second molar, and a fragment of a premolar is from a site called Pyrgos Vassilissis, northwest of Athens, and is dated from the late Miocene around 7.2 million years old. Excavation of the site is not possible (as of 1986) due to the owner having built a swimming pool on the location.

The thick enamel and large molars are the features that convinced von Koenigswald that the specimen belonged to a hominid species. X-ray microtomography and 3-dimensional reconstruction in 2017 revealed that it belonged to an adult individual and possibly a male. The partial fusion of the fourth premolar (P4) roots is an additional evidence that it is of a hominid, and the thick enamel resembles those of the human lineage (hominins).

Classification 
G. freybergi is considered to be possibly the same taxon as Ouranopithecus macedoniensis, another extinct hominid described in 1977 from northern Greece. Due to paucity of specimens and poor quality of the fossils, it remains the least well known extinct hominid found within Europe. In 1984, British palaeontologists Peter Andrews and Lawrence B. Martin classified Graecopithecus and Ouranopithecus as synonyms (same taxon) and treated them as members of the genus Sivapithecus. This classification persisted for several years until additional Ouranopithecus fossils were discovered including part of the skull in the 1990s that indicated better distinction as different hominids. Based on new evidences, in 1997, Australian palaeontologist David W. Cameron proposed renaming and inclusion of Ouranopithecus into Graecopithecus based on taxonomic priority with Graecopithecus macedoniensis as a new name for O. macedoniensis. However, better O. macedoniensis specimens were found including a new species Ouranopithecus turkae from Turkey that supported separation of the genus, and such is continue to be generally adopted.

Re-examination and reinterpretation 
In 2017, an international team of palaeontologists led by Madelaine Böhme (Eberhard-Karls-University Tübingen, Germany) published detailed reanalysis and new interpretation in the journal PLOS One. One paper deals with an examination of the detailed morphology of molar teeth of G. freybergi from Greece and Bulgaria, and compared it with that of Ouranopithecus. The study concluded that Graecopithecus was a hominin, sharing ancestry with Homo but not with the chimpanzees (Pan), and distinct from Ouranopithecus, which has more ape-like traits. If this classification is correct, Graecopithecus would be the oldest known representative of the human lineage after the human-chimpanzee split, in 19th-century terminology, the "missing link" between human and non-human primates. The species was found to be some two hundred thousand years older than the oldest known hominid found in Africa (not necessarily ancestral to the human lineage), Sahelanthropus tchadensis. The study concludes:[The] dental root attributes of Graecopithecus suggest hominin affinities, such that its hominin status cannot be excluded. If this status is confirmed by additional fossil evidence, Graecopithecus would be the oldest known hominin and the oldest known crown hominine, as the evidence for the gorillin status of Chororapithecus is much weaker than the hominin status of Graecopithecus. More fossils are needed but at this point it seems likely that the Eastern Mediterranean needs to be considered as just as likely a place of hominine diversification and hominin origins as tropical Africa.An accompanying paper presents the study of the geological environments of the areas where the fossils were discovered. Until then, the precise date of Graecopithecus has not been resolved and usually inferred from geological data of materials related the fossils and surrounding areas that add to uncertainty in its evolutionary importance and relationship with other hominids. It is often broadly described as 6.6 to 8 million years old. The PLOS One paper resolved that the hominid lived 7.37 to 7.11 million years ago, with the specime from Greece dated to 7.18 Ma and that from Bulgaria to 7.24 Ma. It also indicates that as the species lived in Europe, it suggest "that major splits in the hominid family occurred outside Africa."

It has also been proposed the Graecopithecus may not be a direct ancestor of the human lineage, but instead may have evolved its hominin-like traits independently. The emergence of Homo itself is dated to close to 4 million years later than Graecopithecus, so that the appearance of Graecopithecus in Europe does not preclude the development of Homo proper in East Africa (as suggested by Homo habilis being found in Tanzania); however, the popular press reporting on the 2017 study did cast its result in terms of determining the "birthplace of mankind". Graecopithecus lived in southeast Europe 7.2 million years ago, and if the premise of the study is correct, Graecopithecus, after evolving in Europe, would have migrated to Africa about 7 million years ago where its descendants would eventually evolve into the genus Homo.

Criticism 
The 2017 PLOS One papers made two critical conclusions: that Graecopithecus is a hominin suggesting it as the oldest ancestor of humans after splitting from chimpazees, and that as Graecopithecus is a human ancestor, Europe is the birthplace of hominins. This directly challenges the prevailing knowledge that humans originated in East Africa.

David R. Begun of the University of Toronto, Canada, one of the co-authors, was quoted as saying that "[t]his dating allows us to move the human-chimpanzee split into the Mediterranean area." This was set against a quote by an uninvolved anthropologist saying that "[i]t is possible that the human lineage originated in Europe, but very substantial fossil evidence places the origin in Africa [...] I would be hesitant about using a single character from an isolated fossil to set against the evidence from Africa." Since 1994, Begun had adhered to a hypothesis that African hominids (including living apes) descended from Eurasian apes since the older ape fossils are found in Europa and Asia. This is a feasible explanation as it is possible that the African ape ancestors could move to Africa around 9 million years ago from Europe.

However, claiming that Graecopithecus is an evidence of human origin in Europe is illogical since all human ancestral species known so far are strictly found in Africa; as Rick Potts, head of the Smithsonian’s Human Origins Program, remarked: "I think the principal claim of the main paper goes well beyond the evidence in hand... A hominin or even a hominine (modern African ape) ancestor located in a fairly isolated place in southern Europe doesn’t make much sense geographically as the ancestor of modern African apes, or particular the oldest ancestor of African hominins." David Alba at the Catalan Institute of Palaeontology in Barcelona was the first to point out that "It is not surprising at all that Begun is now arguing that hominins as well originated in Europe." Julien Benoit of the University of the Witwatersrand, Johannesburg, South Africa, also commented: "Any study that counters this consensus (Out of Africa theory) would have to provide very strong evidence and perfect methodology to support its claim. In my opinion, this article doesn't meet those criteria."

Other scientists have also expressed skepticism of Begun's classification. Bernard Wood at George Washington University described the hypothesis as "relatively weak" and Sergio Almécija, also at George Washington University, says it is important to bear in mind that primates seem particularly prone to evolving similar features independently. "Single characters are not reliable to make big evolutionary [claims]." Tim White at the University of California, Berkeley, asserted that the study was merely an attempt "to resurrect Begun’s tired argument with a long-known crappy fossil, newly scanned."

Reassessment 
In late 2017, Julien Benoit and Francis J. Thackeray re-analysed the claims of the PLOS One papers and found key issues in the major conclusions:

 The partial fusion of the fourth premolar (P4) roots does not define Graecopithecus as a hominin since the feature is common in hominids, even in the chimpanzees.
 Thick enamel and relatively large molar teeth are not exclusive to hominins as they are also present in other Miocene apes and gorillas.
 The claim that Graecopithecus is the ancestral ape of human lineage and that humans originate in Europe is not justified. Even if Graecopithecus is the basal (root ancestor) ape, all other human ancestral species starting from Sahelanthropus were in Africa, thus, still making Africa as the birthplace of humans.

The study concludes:[We] recognise a small signal for placing Graecopithecus at the root of the Hominini clade. This means that the phylogenetic relationship between Graecopithecus and Hominini is as yet not confirmed. Our analysis supports the view that Graecopithecus is potentially an important taxon for the origin of Hominini, but this is not certain and deserves further investigation and more material.

Response 
In 2018, Fuss, Spassov, Böhme, and Begun published a response to Benoit and Thackeray, claiming that their original publication had been misrepresented and misconstrued. The conclusion of the 2017 paper had not been that Graecopithecus was certainly a hominin, but that its status as a hominin could not be ruled out, and that more research and evidence would be needed to make a conclusion—a conclusion that Benoit and Thackeray make in their own paper as well. Fuss et al. also point out that, contrary to what Benoit and Thackeray write, they did not judge canine root derivation of Graecopithecus and Salehanthropus against each other, stating that the differences between them were within the range of sexual variation. Additionally, when Benoit and Thackeray claim that the characteristics mentioned in the 2017 paper are not unique to Hominini, they do not mention that the 2017 paper discusses canine root size and premolar root complexity reduction, which could be indications of Hominini. Benoit and Thackeray also refer to taxonomy that combines Graecopithecus and Ouranopithecus, despite the two generally being considered to be separate species, with Graecopithecus being more closely related to hominins than Ouranopithecus.

Fuss et al. emphasize that they do not present Graecopithecus as being a hominin without question, but that it has traits similar to hominids, and that more evidence is needed before Graecopithecuss status as a hominin can be confirmed or rejected.

See also

References 

Miocene primates of Europe
Hominin fossils
Prehistoric Greece
 Graecopithecus
Prehistoric primate genera
Neogene fossil record
Fossil taxa described in 1972
Fossils of Serbia